Steuben (also Adaria, Greenfield, Greenfield Center, Lafayette, or Stuben) is an unincorporated community in central Greenfield Township, Huron County, Ohio, United States, located a few miles northeast of the village of Willard.  It lies along State Route 162 approximately three miles (five kilometers) west of North Fairfield.

Steuben has two churches and an elementary school, Greenfield Elementary, which is part of the Willard City School District.  It has no commercial buildings.

References

Unincorporated communities in Huron County, Ohio
Unincorporated communities in Ohio